Ault–Weygandt Farm is a registered historic district near Orrville, Ohio, listed in the National Register on 2002-01-14.  It contains 2 contributing buildings.

Historic uses 
Single Dwelling
Storage
Agricultural Fields
Animal Facility
Agricultural Outbuildings

See also 
 Niels Nielsen Fourteen-Side Barn Farm: another Chicago House Wrecking Company kit building

References

External links
National Register nomination form

Farms on the National Register of Historic Places in Ohio
Historic districts on the National Register of Historic Places in Ohio
Buildings and structures in Wayne County, Ohio
National Register of Historic Places in Wayne County, Ohio